Humberto Rodríguez (born 7 March 1969) is a Mexican former professional boxer who competed from 1989 to 1998. As an amateur, he competed in the men's light welterweight event at the 1988 Summer Olympics.

References

External links
 
 

1969 births
Living people
Mexican male boxers
Olympic boxers of Mexico
Boxers at the 1988 Summer Olympics
Place of birth missing (living people)
Light-welterweight boxers